Energy Transfer LP is an American company engaged in natural gas and propane pipeline transport. It is organized under Delaware state laws and headquartered in Dallas, Texas. It was founded in 1995 by Ray Davis and Kelcy Warren, who remains Chairman and CEO. It owns a 36.4% interest in Dakota Access, LLC, the company responsible for developing the Dakota Access Pipeline.

Corporate structure
As of 2022, it controlled 11,600 miles of pipelines and two storage facilities in the state of Texas.

History
The company was founded by Kelcy Warren and Ray Davis in 1995. In 2011, the company along with and Regency Energy Partners purchased midstream assets from Castleton Commodities International  for $2 billion.

In October 2012, Sunoco, Inc. became a wholly owned subsidiary of the company. It acquired the general partner interests, 100% of the incentive distribution rights, and a 32.4% limited partnership interest in Sunoco Logistics Partners L.P., which operates a geographically diverse portfolio of crude oil and refined products pipelines, terminating and crude oil acquisition and marketing assets. The same year it acquired Southern Union Company.

In August 2014, the company acquired Susser Holdings Corporation, which operated Stripes, a chain of 580+ convenience stores in Texas, New Mexico, and Oklahoma, which were re-branded under the Sunoco and A-Plus names.

In January 2015, the company acquired Regency Energy Partners for $11 billion.

In October 2018, the company was renamed as Energy Operating L.P. after it was acquired by Energy Transfer Equity. In September 2019, the company acquired SemGroup for $5 billion. In January 2020, former Energy Secretary Rick Perry rejoined the company's board.

Dakota Access Pipeline

Dakota Access, LLC is owned 36.4% by the company and built the Bakken pipeline, also known as the Dakota Access Pipeline.
In April 2016, the United States Environmental Protection Agency, United States Department of the Interior, and Advisory Council on Historic Preservation requested a full Environmental Impact Statement of the pipeline.
In July 2016, the Standing Rock Sioux Tribe filed an injunction against the US Army Corps of Engineers to stop building the pipeline. 
A group of young activists from Standing Rock ran from North Dakota to Washington, D.C. to present a petition in protest of the construction of the pipeline and launched an international campaign called ReZpect Our Water. In October 2016, Dakota Access Pipeline protests erupted at a construction site near the Cannonball River in North Dakota, resulting in the arrest of hundreds and the use of force by a private security company, North Dakota State and county police, and the NewMexico National Guard.

In August 2017, Energy Transfer sued environmental groups Greenpeace USA, BankTrack and Earth First! under the Patriot Act.
Energy Transfer accused these activists of attempting to profit via eco-terrorism.
Banktrack responded that the case is a strategic lawsuit against public participation without merit and that it is legal to inform the public and banks about projects with 'actual negative social, environmental and human rights impacts.' In 2019 a federal court in North Dakota dismissed the racketeering and defamation lawsuit filed by Energy Transfer Partners LP, the builder of the 1,000-mile Dakota Access Pipeline, against Greenpeace USA, EarthFirst and BankTrack for their pipeline protests. The lawsuit alleged Greenpeace USA misled the public with false claims about the Standing Rock Sioux tribes' sacred sites and the likelihood the pipeline would contaminate the Missouri River in North Dakota. In contrast, a 2018 Greenpeace report said Energy Transfer pipelines and those owned by the company's subsidiaries "spilled over 500 times in the last decade."

References

External links
 

Natural gas companies of the United States
Natural gas pipeline companies
Crude oil pipelines companies
Oil pipeline companies
Petroleum in Texas
Companies based in Dallas
Energy companies established in 1995
Non-renewable resource companies established in 1995
1995 establishments in Texas
American companies established in 1995
Companies listed on the New York Stock Exchange